Mitron is a 2018 Indian Hindi-language romantic comedy film directed by Nitin Kakkar, written by Sharib Hashmi and produced by Vikram Malhotra under the Abundantia Entertainment banner. An official remake of the 2016 Telugu film Pelli Choopulu, it stars Jackky Bhagnani with Kritika Kamra, Pratik Gandhi and Shivam Parekh in their film debuts. Set in the Gujarati milieu, the film traces the journey of Jay and Avni, as they set out on the path of finding themselves amidst their social and cultural backgrounds. The film was released on 14 September 2018.

Plot 
Jay's father is not happy with Jay's relaxed approach to life and so, in an attempt to get him to mature, he arranges for him to meet a girl with an eye for marriage. Unfortunately, Jay's father gets the address wrong and they end up at Avni's house. Avni also happens to also be expecting a boy. Both families send the couple upstairs to see if they like each other and by accident, Jay ends up locking them in along with Avni's young cousin. From hereon ensues a chain of circumstances that will change their lives forever..

Cast 
 Jackky Bhagnani as Jay Patel
 Kritika Kamra as Avni Gandhi
 Pratik Gandhi as Raunak
 Prateik Babbar as Vikram
 Perlene Bhersaina as Richa
 Neeraj Sood as Jay's Father
 Shivam Parekh as Deepak "Deepu”
 Mohan Kapoor as Richa’s father
  Bimal Trivedi

Production 
It is a remake of the 2016 Telugu film Pelli Choopulu. The film was shot in various cities of Gujarat including Ahmedabad, Surat, Vadodara and Siddhpur.

Soundtrack 

Tanishk Bagchi, Yo Yo Honey Singh, Vayu, Sameer Uddin, Lijo George-DJ Chetas, Shaarib-Toshi and Abhishek Nailwal composed the soundtrack of the film. Yo Yo Honey Singh, Atif Aslam, Darshan Raval, Jubin Nautiyal, Sonu Nigam, Nikhita Gandhi, Bappi Lahiri and Raja Hasan rendered their voice for the soundtrack of the film. Lyrics are written by Hommie Dilliwala, Vayu, Tanishk Bagchi, Kumaar, Kalim Shaikh and Akshay Verma.

Bagchi recreated the song "Chalte Chalte Yoon Hi Koi" from the 1972 film Pakeezah, in the voice of Atif Aslam. He was criticized by many people, including Lata Mangeshkar, the singer of the original song.

Reception

References

External links 
 
 

2010s Hindi-language films
2018 films
2018 romantic comedy films
Films shot in Ahmedabad
Films shot in Daman and Diu
Films shot in Gujarat
Hindi remakes of Telugu films
Indian romantic comedy films